The 1999 United States rugby union tour of Australia, England and Wales was a series of matches played in July and August 1999 in Australia, England and Wales by the USA national rugby union team in order to prepare the 1999 Rugby World Cup.

Results
'Scores and results list USA's points tally first.

References

USA
United States national rugby union team tours
tour
Rugby union tours of Australia
Rugby union tours of England
Rugby union tours of Wales